Barn theatre is a summer theatrical scene in a barn.

Barn theatre or Barn Theatre may also refer to:
Barn theatres in Lithuania, tradition to stage performances and concerts in barns in Lithuania
The Barn Theatre, Augusta, Michigan
Barn Theatre, Welwyn Garden City, barn converted into a theatre, England
Barn Theatre (Cirencester), Cirencester, UK

See also

Barn theatres